Mycolicibacterium agri (formerly Mycobacterium agri) is a species of bacteria from the phylum Actinomycetota that was first isolated from soil. It is non-pigmented and grows rapidly at 25–45 °C on Ogawa egg medium. It has also been isolated from a human skin infection, and raw milk M. agri is capable of degrading octocrylene.

References

Acid-fast bacilli
algi
Bacteria described in 1981